Culoz-Béon is a commune nouvelle in the Ain department in the Auvergne-Rhône-Alpes region of France. It is the result of the merger, on 1 January 2023, of the former communes of Béon and Culoz.

History 
The commune nouvelle was officially created on 1 January 2023 from a prefectural decree of 12 December 2022 and with the transformation of the two former communes into "delegated communes".

Politics and administration

Delegated communes

See also 

 Communes of the Ain department

References 

Communes of Ain
Communes nouvelles of Ain
Populated places established in 2023
2023 establishments in France